= LaLaVoice =

Vocal synthesizer

- The LaLaSong interface
- Operating system: Windows 98, 2000, Me, XP
- Available in: Japanese
- Type: Voice synthesizer
- Website: www3.toshiba.co.jp/pc/lalavoice

LaLaVoice (ララボイス) is a vocal synthesizer designed for the Japanese language.

== Overview ==
The last version of the software was titled "LaLaVoice2001". The software was only released in Japanese and a Japanese OS was needed for the software.

LaLaVoice had several capabilities, which it mostly gained from basic text-to-speech input, though it was also possible to input the sounds using a microphone. As well as simple reading of text, it had the ability to produce singing vocals ("LaLaSong") and read specific frames of webpages. The vocals were robotic sounding when played. The vocals themselves were based on a family of characters from more realistic members of the family (such as a grandmother, girl, boy, grandfather, etc.) to those intended to be soul based on robots.

The software also supported Microsoft Office and could be used with Excel or Word and could even read e-mails.

The last function the software had was a mode where a rabbit called "SuPaamimi" ("すぅぱぁみみ") would act as a schedule management program. SuPaamimi installed with a link on the desktop and would read appointments out.
